Nuttby Mountain is a Canadian peak in the Cobequid Mountains and at 360.6 metres is one of the highest elevation points on the mainland portion of Nova Scotia. Its longstanding claim to be the highest peak was disproven in 2017 when it was discovered that Higgins Mountain near Folly Lake is 363.7 metres and an unnamed peak near Hart Lake is 365.02 metres.

Located west of Route 311 in Colchester County some 20 km north of Truro, the peak is accessible by vehicle using a gated road and is topped by telecommunication towers. A fire lookout tower stood there from 1937 to 2013.  A 45-megawatt wind farm was constructed on a 400-acre site on the mountain in 2010. As of 2017 Nova Scotia Power owned 22 Enercon E82 turbines on the site with a total capacity of 50.6 MW.

See also
 List of highest points of Canadian provinces and territories
 Nuttby, Nova Scotia, nearby settlement

References

External links
 Atlas of Canada - Facts about mountains

Mountains of Nova Scotia
Landforms of Colchester County
Mountains of Canada under 1000 metres